Suber may refer to:
 Quercus suber, the cork oak, a plant species
 Schistura suber, a ray-finned fish species
 Lorenzo Suber (born 1912), Italian professional football player
 Peter Suber (born 1951), philosopher